The following outline is provided as an overview of and topical guide to Ghana:

Ghana – sovereign country in West Africa in Africa.  The word "Ghana" means "Warrior King", and was the source of the name "Guinea" (via French Guinoye) used to refer to the West African coast (as in Gulf of Guinea). Ghana was inhabited in pre-colonial times by a number of ancient predominantly Akan kingdoms, foremost the Bono state, including the inland  Empire of Ashanti and various Fante states along the coast and inland. Trade with European states flourished after contact with the Portuguese in the 15th century, and the British established a crown colony, Gold Coast, in 1874. Upon achieving independence from the United Kingdom in 1957, the name Ghana was chosen for the new nation to reflect the ancient Empire of Ghana that once extended throughout much of Western Africa. In the Akan language it is spelled Gaana.

General reference

 Pronunciation: 
 Common English country name: Ghana
 Official English country name: The Republic of Ghana
 Common endonym(s):  
 Official endonym(s):  
 Adjectival(s): Ghanaian
 Demonym(s):
 International rankings of Ghana
 ISO country codes: GH, GHA, 288
 ISO region codes: See ISO 3166-2:GH
 Internet country code top-level domain: .gh

Geography of Ghana 

Geography of Ghana
 Ghana is: a country
 Regions : 16 Regions
 Population of Ghana: 28,830,000  - 48th most populous country
 Area of Ghana: 238,535 km2
 Atlas of Ghana

Location 
 Ghana is situated within the following regions:
 Northern Hemisphere, on the Prime Meridian
 Africa
 West Africa
 Time zone:  Coordinated Universal Time UTC+00
 Extreme points of Ghana
 High:  Mount Afadja 
 Low:  Gulf of Guinea 0 m
 Land boundaries:  2,094 km
 877 km
 668 km
 549 km
 Coastline:  539 km

Environment of Ghana 

 Climate of Ghana
 Geology of Ghana
 Protected areas of Ghana
 National parks of Ghana
 Wildlife of Ghana
 Fauna of Ghana
 Birds of Ghana
 Mammals of Ghana

Natural geographic features of Ghana 
 Glaciers in Ghana: none 
 Rivers of Ghana
 World Heritage Sites in Ghana

16 Regions of Ghana 
 Regions of Ghana
Districts of Ghana

Administrative divisions of Ghana 
Administrative divisions of Ghana

Provinces of Ghana

Districts of Ghana 

Districts of Ghana

Municipalities of Ghana 
 Capital of Ghana: Accra
 Cities of Ghana

Demography of Ghana 
Demographics of Ghana

Government and politics of Ghana 
Politics of Ghana
 Form of government: presidential representative democratic republic
 Capital of Ghana: Accra
 Elections in Ghana
 Political parties in Ghana

Branches of the government of Ghana 

Government of Ghana

Executive branch of the government of Ghana 
 Head of state: President of Ghana,
 Head of government: Prime Minister of Ghana,

Legislative branch of the government of Ghana 
 Parliament of Ghana (unicameral)

Judicial branch of the government of Ghana 

Judiciary of Ghana
 Supreme Court of Ghana

Foreign relations of Ghana 

Foreign relations of Ghana
 Diplomatic missions in Ghana
 Diplomatic missions of Ghana

International organization membership 
The Republic of Ghana is a member of:

African, Caribbean, and Pacific Group of States (ACP)
African Development Bank Group (AfDB)
African Union (AU)
African Union/United Nations Hybrid operation in Darfur (UNAMID)
Commonwealth of Nations
Economic Community of West African States (ECOWAS)
Food and Agriculture Organization (FAO)
Group of 24 (G24)
Group of 77 (G77)
International Atomic Energy Agency (IAEA)
International Bank for Reconstruction and Development (IBRD)
International Chamber of Commerce (ICC)
International Civil Aviation Organization (ICAO)
International Criminal Court (ICCt)
International Criminal Police Organization (Interpol)
International Development Association (IDA)
International Federation of Red Cross and Red Crescent Societies (IFRCS)
International Finance Corporation (IFC)
International Fund for Agricultural Development (IFAD)
International Labour Organization (ILO)
International Maritime Organization (IMO)
International Mobile Satellite Organization (IMSO)
International Monetary Fund (IMF)
International Olympic Committee (IOC)
International Organization for Migration (IOM)
International Organization for Standardization (ISO)
International Red Cross and Red Crescent Movement (ICRM)
International Telecommunication Union (ITU)
International Telecommunications Satellite Organization (ITSO)

International Trade Union Confederation (ITUC)
Inter-Parliamentary Union (IPU)
Multilateral Investment Guarantee Agency (MIGA)
Nonaligned Movement (NAM)
Organisation internationale de la Francophonie (OIF) (associate member)
Organisation for the Prohibition of Chemical Weapons (OPCW)
Organization of American States (OAS) (observer)
United Nations (UN)
United Nations Conference on Trade and Development (UNCTAD)
United Nations Educational, Scientific, and Cultural Organization (UNESCO)
United Nations High Commissioner for Refugees (UNHCR)
United Nations Industrial Development Organization (UNIDO)
United Nations Institute for Training and Research (UNITAR)
United Nations Interim Force in Lebanon (UNIFIL)
United Nations Mission for the Referendum in Western Sahara (MINURSO)
United Nations Mission in Liberia (UNMIL)
United Nations Mission in the Central African Republic and Chad (MINURCAT)
United Nations Observer Mission in Georgia (UNOMIG)
United Nations Operation in Cote d'Ivoire (UNOCI)
United Nations Organization Mission in the Democratic Republic of the Congo (MONUC)
Universal Postal Union (UPU)
World Confederation of Labour (WCL)
World Customs Organization (WCO)
World Federation of Trade Unions (WFTU)
World Health Organization (WHO)
World Intellectual Property Organization (WIPO)
World Meteorological Organization (WMO)
World Tourism Organization (UNWTO)
World Trade Organization (WTO)

Law and order in Ghana 

 Constitution of Ghana
 Human rights in Ghana
 Abortion in Ghana
 LGBT rights in Ghana
 Law enforcement in Ghana

Military of Ghana 
Military of Ghana
 Command
 Commander-in-chief:
 Ministry of Defence of Ghana
 Forces
 Army of Ghana
 Navy of Ghana
 Air Force of Ghana

History of Ghana

Period-coverage 
Early history
Colonial era
Dominion 
1966 to 1979

By field
 Economic history of Ghana
 History of the Jews in Ghana
 Political history of Ghana
 Postage stamps and postal history of Ghana

By populated place 
 Elmina

Culture of Ghana 
Culture of Ghana
 Cuisine of Ghana
 Festivals in Ghana
 Ghanaian literature
 Languages of Ghana
 Social conduct in Ghana
 Media in Ghana
 National symbols of Ghana
 Coat of arms of Ghana
 Flag of Ghana
 National anthem of Ghana
 Prostitution in Ghana
 Public holidays in Ghana
 Religion in Ghana
 Christianity in Ghana
 Hinduism in Ghana
 Islam in Ghana
 Ahmadiyya in Ghana
 World Heritage Sites in Ghana

Art in Ghana 
 Akan art
 Cinema of Ghana
Kumawood
 Kente cloth
 Music of Ghana
 Afrobeats
 Gh hiphop
 Hiplife
 Highlife
 Raglife
 Video gaming in Ghana

Sports in Ghana 
Sports in Ghana
 Football in Ghana
 Ghana at the Olympics
 Rugby union in Ghana

Economy and infrastructure of Ghana 
Economy of Ghana
 Economic rank, by nominal GDP (2007): 101st (one hundred and first)
 Agriculture in Ghana (Fishing in Ghana, Forestry in Ghana)
 Communications in Ghana
 Internet in Ghana
Ghana Internet Policy
New media in Ghana
 Companies of Ghana
Currency of Ghana: Cedi
ISO 4217: GHS
 Electricity sector in Ghana
 Healthcare in Ghana
 Petroleum industry in Ghana
 Mining in Ghana
 Manufacturing in Ghana
 Ghana Stock Exchange
 Salt industry in Ghana
 Trade unions in Ghana
 Transport in Ghana
 Airports in Ghana
 Rail transport in Ghana
 Road Network
 Water supply and sanitation in Ghana

Education in Ghana 
Education in Ghana

Health in Ghana 

Health in Ghana

 Eye care in Ghana
 Optometry in Ghana

See also

Ghana
Index of Ghana-related articles
List of Ghana-related topics
List of international rankings
Member state of the Commonwealth of Nations
Member state of the United Nations
Outline of Africa
Outline of geography

References

External links

 Ghana News
Ghana Broadcasting Corporation
Latest Ghana News
Headline News, photos, video from Ghana
News in Ghana

 Government
Ghana official Website
The Parliament of Ghana official site
National Commission on Culture official site
Ghana On Net! – History of Ghana at www.ghanaonnet.com
Ghana's Independence Video by Information Services Department

 Healthcare
 Korle Bu Hospital
 Unite For Sight at Buduburam Refugee Camp, Ghana A Unite For Sight video documentary with interviews of residents at Buduburam Refugee Camp, Ghana. Unite For Sight provides free eye care for the residents.
 Subayo Foundation A not for profit charity for women and children in Ghana based out of the US.

 Overviews
Rural poverty in Ghana (IFAD)
 
 Encyclopædia Britannica, Country Page - Ghana
 CIA World Factbook - Ghana
  Ethnologue Ghana languages
 

 US State Department — Ghana includes Background Notes, Country Study and major reports
Business Anti-Corruption Portal Ghana Country Profile
Historical Notes and Memorial Inscriptions From Ghana, Compiled 1988 to 1990 by M.E.J. Crew of Ofinso Training College, Ofinso, Ashanti, Ghana
 Short Documentary looking at the problems faced by Ghana's rice farmers

 Teaching resources
 Ghana: And Annotated List of Books and Other Resources for Teaching About Ghana
 Proverbs from Ghana

 Tourism

 Ghana Tourism Official Ghana Tourism Website
 Ghana@50 official independence anniversary site
 Teaching in Ghana
 Pictures Ghana
 Ghana Tourism Information
 user generated tourism information on Ghana

Ghana